Fruits of Passion is a 1981 French-Japanese co-production directed by Shūji Terayama and starring Klaus Kinski. The film is loosely based on the novel Retour à Roissy by Anne Desclos, written as a sequel to the Story of O.

Plot
The lead characters of the Story of O and Retour à Roissy novels, Sir Stephen and O, are placed in southern China where Sir Stephen owns a casino. Sir Stephen places O in a Chinese brothel for "training" and O is then subjected to a variety of humiliating experiences to prove her unconditional obedience. A sub-plot concerns a local rebellion due to the resentment towards Europeans by the local population and a young man desperate to afford O's favors at the brothel.

Cast
 Isabelle Illiers as O
 Klaus Kinski as Sir Stephen
 Arielle Dombasle as Nathalie
 Peter as Madame
 Keiko Niitaka as Aisen
 Sayoko Yamaguchi as Sakuya
 Hitomi Takahashi as Byakuran
 Miyuki Ono as Kasen
 Yuka Kamebuchi
 Kenichi Nakamura as Le jeune homme, Ogaku
 Akiro Suetsugu as Obana
 Renji Ishibashi as Kato
 Takeshi Wakamatsu as Le gardien de la maison
 Georges Wilson as Le narrateur (voice)

Production
In a 2017 interview with VSD (French magazine), Arielle Dombasle looked back on the film with regret: "It's something that hurt me terribly, I was too young to do that, and then Kinski ... he was crazy." She added about Kinski: "He's a guy who crushes the weak, the ugliest thing in the world, someone who loved power, who absolutely wanted to be loved, and who did everything to make sure we did not love him."

In his autobiography, Klaus Kinski wrote all the sex scenes in which he participated in this movie were unsimulated.

Release
The film was released in France on 3 June 1981 as Les fruits de la passion and as Shanghai Ijin Shōkan - China Doll in Japan with censoring of the pubic areas in November 1981. The USA release as Fruits of Passion with English dubbing occurred in November 1982. A version in Japanese with English subtitles on VHS tape and DVD was published as Fruits of Passion - The Story of "O" Continued on 20 June 2000. A digitally remastered version of the film was released in Japan in Japanese, English and French with Japanese subtitles in December 2005.

Reception
Reaction to the film has been mixed, Roberta Novielli described it as "shallow and decadent" and Jasper Sharp calls it "minor Terayama" whose "charms are mainly cosmetic", the costuming, sets and cinematography. Thomas and Yuko Mihara Weisser give the movie three stars out of four but say it is based on the "look" of the film and not on its narrative or coherence.

References

External links

1981 films
1981 drama films
BDSM in films
French erotic drama films
Japanese erotic drama films
1980s French-language films
1980s Japanese-language films
1980s English-language films
1980s erotic drama films
Japanese multilingual films
French multilingual films
Films based on French novels
Films directed by Shūji Terayama
Films produced by Anatole Dauman
1981 multilingual films
1980s Japanese films
1980s French films